Panagaeus bipustulatus is a species of ground beetle native to Europe and the Near East. In Europe, it is found in Austria, Belarus, Belgium, Bosnia and Herzegovina, Bulgaria, the Czech Republic, mainland Denmark, Estonia, Finland, mainland France, Germany, Great Britain including the Isle of Man, Hungary, mainland Italy, Kaliningrad, Latvia, Liechtenstein, Lithuania, Luxembourg, Moldova, Poland, Romania, Russia, Slovakia, Slovenia, mainland Spain, Sweden, Switzerland, the Netherlands and Ukraine.

References

External links

Panagaeinae
Beetles of Europe
Beetles described in 1775
Taxa named by Johan Christian Fabricius